The Greenhouse Conspiracy is a documentary film broadcast by Channel 4 in the United Kingdom on 12 August 1990, as part of the Equinox series, which rejected the scientific consensus on climate change and claimed that scientists critical of global warming theory were denied funding.

Context
It is one of the earliest instances of the suggestion of a conspiracy to promote false claims supporting global warming. Although the title of the program implied the existence of a conspiracy, when interviewed on the program, Patrick Michaels played down the idea.

See also

Further reading

References

Climate change denial
Documentary films about conspiracy theories
Documentary films about global warming
Environmentally skeptical films
Equinox (TV series)